was a public junior college in Jōetsu, Niigata, Japan. It was established in 1977 as vocational school, and became a junior college in 1994. It was closed on March 31, 2005.

Academic departments 
 Nursing

Advanced courses 
 Public Health Nurse studies
 Midwifery studies

See also 
 List of junior colleges in Japan

References

External links
  

Japanese junior colleges
Universities and colleges in Niigata Prefecture
Educational institutions disestablished in 2005